Dead-character costumes are modified stage clothes worn by actors whose characters are shot and wounded in movies, TV shows or stage performances. They are an important component in the overall special effects process to help create a believable and dramatic scene that captures the audience's attention. Usually, several identical sets of these costumes are specially bought and prepared for the planned number of takes as "consumables" and spent costumes are not reused and end up on the "dead-character rack", which is different from other clothing articles that return to a costume shop. In the main figure, an actor is shown wearing a modified set of scrubs as the dead character costume and checks the squibs are in the correct positions before turning the controller in the pocket on.

Costumes used for bullet hit squibs 

The simulation of a performer getting shot and wounded on screen or in live theatre involves using a bullet hit squib device that bursts out a small packet of fake blood hidden beneath the costume. In most cases, the effect is carried out with clothing to conceal the device, where bullet holes on the fabric are precut before attaching the squibs. In this case, it serves as a canvas for the special effect, allowing the audience to see the simulated injury in real-time. At least one hero piece (used in prior scenes and closeups without squibs) and several more (3-6) identical stunt pieces (with squibs and prescored bullet holes) are prepared for the planned number of takes, filming schedule, dress rehearsals, backups and tests. In general, it is a good idea to have a few extra replicates on hand, in case of unexpected device malfunction or changes in the shooting schedule to ensure the stunt runs smoothly. Consideration should also be given to the colour of the outfit (sufficiently bright) and/or the set lighting to show the bloodstains. Here, the light blue set of scrubs is used as an example.

Preparation of the costume 
The number, sequence and locations of bullet holes (~50 mm large) are first determined. Bullet holes on the clothing's fabric must first be weakened (by law) by cutting, sanding, scoring, grating or plunging a scoring tool, after which they are loosely glued or taped back together so from a distance, the fabric appears intact. If the fabric is not completely cut, the blast from the squib should create a frayed rip through the weakened area, but must be verified on a trial set of the costume (or at an area of the costume not visible to the camera, if the budget is limited).

Because of the size and weight of the entire bullet hit squib assembly (~50 mm diameter, ~15 mm thick, weighing ~30 g), depending on the weight and thickness of the clothing fabric, it is either sewn or taped directly to the inside of the outfit, allowing the fake blood to be propelled out of the bullet hole instead of running down the inside of the costume. Any inner lining and filling  present are removed to access the site and to reduce the overall thickness and bulge. A well-made, low-profile bullet hit squib device should not be too conspicuous beneath the costume, neither should the pre-scoring of the fabric, as shown in the gallery figures. In any case, bullet holes that are visible on the fabric in the gunshot scene immediately before the squibs explode can also be erased during post-production.

On jackets with multiple frontal squibs, the costumer may install an additional zip at the back to allow the actor to slip on the jacket without needing to disturb the squibs. The costumer should also ensure that all zips and buttons are fastened for visual and safety purposes to prevent recoil to prevent the bullet hit squibs from being revealed and/or aiming at unintended directions.

Reusing dead-character costumes 
Most types of clothing are used once per take, thereby requiring a significant wardrobe budget especially for films and where many characters are shot. However, some types of clothing can be reused. Fake blood can be wiped off waterproof jackets, parkas and down jackets for a new take. There are several advantages to using a jacket as a dead character costume in a movie or theatrical performance:

 Versatility: Jackets are a versatile and easily adaptable garment that can be modified to fit a wide range of characters and settings. They can be worn over other clothing to create different styles, providing a more sophisticated aesthetic and a higher production value.
 Concealment: Jackets provide sufficient padding to conceal the squibs, wiring and controller, as well as supporting multiple squibs, helping to maintain the illusion of a real gunshot wound.
 Comfort: Jackets are typically lightweight and comfortable to wear, making them a suitable choice for extended periods of filming or performing as well as being easier to put on, thus minimising the risk of prematurely rupturing the blood packets.
 Cost-effectiveness: Jackets are widely available, and especially beneficial for actors in stage productions who wear the same piece for each show, and extras who fill multiple roles, making them a cost-effective choice for a dead character costume, reducing or eliminating the need for duplicates.
 Reusability: Jackets can be easily modified and reused for multiple takes and productions, as long as the bullet holes are cleanly cut beforehand, making them a smart investment for a special effects wardrobe asset.

Overall, using a jacket as a dead character costume provides a flexible and practical solution for creating a convincing bullet hit squib special effect, and can help to enhance the overall production value of a movie or theatrical performance.

Moreover, using dry simulants like dust, or down feathers (for the desired gunshot aesthetic on a down jacket), or non-staining simulants like water instead of fake blood for dress rehearsals eliminates the potential for staining.

If down jackets were to be used, then the down filling should be repacked in a taffeta pocket to preserve the down feathers and the quited puffer appearance. The jacket used in the gallery here is a two layered jacket with a inner down jacket and an outer shell with no filling, making it easy to prepare while maintaining the down jacket aesthetic.

If the costumes cannot be modified or damaged at all, blood stains can be convincingly simulated with painted nylon tulle mesh with an acrylic top coat. Ripped fabric portraying a bullet hole can also thus be built on top of the mesh. The advantage is that the stains can be repositioned before being sewn onto the fabric for the production and removed afterwards, effectively enabling the costume to be reused without damage or staining. The disadvantage is that it cannot portray the blood spray effect with a bullet hit squib, so CGI may be needed to simulate this effect.

Performing with bullet hit squibs 
The squibs are connected to a trigger operable by the actor or a crew member, a power source (e.g. battery) and sometimes also a programmable controller to sync with multiple squibs. The prepared stunt costume is considerably heavier and bulkier than the hero version, and care should be taken when donning the costume not to loosen or rupture the attached squibs. The actor can change into the prepared outfit immediately prior to the shot (if hero and stunt pieces are available), wear it throughout a scene (e.g. in stage productions) or even the entire day, although a two-step ignition procedure should be used to avoid accidental triggering, i.e. a switch with the actor and another with the crew. As shown in the main figure, the actor prepares for the shootout scene by checking the squibs are secure on his costume before turning the controller on in the right pocket and performing a test-fire sequence. In this case, the actor fires the squibs himself without needing a second switch off-camera.

Spent and unspent modified costumes are kept until post-production is completed, in case extra footage is required. Afterwards, spent costumes can be kept as souvenir, auctioned as memorabilia, repaired or donated, especially with high quality winter coats.

Examples

See also
 Firecracker
 Bodily mutilation in film
 Bullet hit squib
 Fake blood
 Practical effect
 Pyrotechnics
 Special effect
 Squib (explosive)

References

Costumes
Stagecraft
Special effects